Ascott is a hamlet and manor house in the English county of Oxfordshire. Ascott lies close to the River Thame north of Dorchester, around about 7 miles (11 km) to the southeast of Oxford in the parish of Stadhampton. 

The original settlement dates to at least the Anglo-Saxon period, and the name ‘Ascott’ is derived from the Old English ēast (east) and cot (cottage). Ascott is recorded in the Domesday Book of 1086 as one of two knight's fees under the lordship of the Bishop of Lincoln, at that time part of the neighbouring parish of Great Milton. The settlement was held until the middle of the thirteenth century by the D'Oyly family until it came under the ownership of a John Fiennes or Fynes, one of the lords of the manor of Ascott, in 1316. 

Ascott remained in the hands of the Fiennes family until the fifteenth century, including under the ownership of James Fiennes, 1st Baron Saye and Sele, a celebrated English soldier and statesman of the Hundred Years' War and Lord Chamberlain to Henry VI of England. By 1510, Ascott was in the possession of the Dormer family, and remained one of the seats of the family for many generations, alongside Rousham House. A substantial house built by Sir William Dormer may have been attacked during a Parliamentarian raid on Ascott during the English Civil War in 1642, and subsequently burnt down. The site of this house forms part of Ascott park. One of the gateway pillars of Ascott park is the subject of surrealist painter and war artist Paul Nash's 1932-1942 oil painting Pillar and Moon, while the gateway itself (as well as its wrought-iron gates) are held by the Victoria and Albert Museum and on display at the Bodleian Library in Oxford. 

Ascott Manor itself dates to the early seventeenth century, having been built in around 1620 in the reign of James I, and later extended around 1800. The house is Grade II listed on the National Heritage List for England.

References

Hamlets in Oxfordshire
Country houses in Oxfordshire
Grade II listed buildings in Oxfordshire
Grade II listed houses
Manor houses in England
Houses completed in 1620
Jacobean architecture in the United Kingdom
South Oxfordshire District
History of Oxfordshire